The Von Allmen Dairy Farm House in Louisville, Kentucky, USA, was placed on the National Register of Historic Places on December 11, 2007. Built in 1919, it was owned by Emil Von Allmen, a Louisville dairy leader. It was described as "the last vestige of a well-known dairy farm".

The house is of Bungalow/Craftsman style, 1½ stories high, with Neo-classical detailing.

Eventually, the consolidation of dairy farming caused the farm to stop producing. Of the original , only  remain of the property, with the rest consumed by Louisville sprawl.

Dean Corbett, chef of the Equus restaurant in St. Matthews, Kentucky, planned to restore the building into a new upscale restaurant called "Corbett's: An American Place". On December 13, 2007, it had a "soft opening" with a hard opening on December 15, 2007.

References

Houses in Louisville, Kentucky
National Register of Historic Places in Louisville, Kentucky
Houses completed in 1919
1919 establishments in Kentucky
Houses on the National Register of Historic Places in Kentucky
Bungalow architecture in Kentucky
Restaurants in Louisville, Kentucky
Dairy buildings in the United States